The Suomen Radioamatööriliitto  (SRAL) (in English, Finnish Amateur Radio League) is a national non-profit organization for amateur radio enthusiasts in Finland.  SRAL was founded in 1921 and has approximately 3,500 members.  SRAL supports amateur radio operators in Finland by sponsoring amateur radio operating awards and radio contests.  SRAL was one of the sponsor organizations for the 2002 World Radiosport Team Championships held near Helsinki.  The SRAL also represents the interests of Finnish amateur radio operators and shortwave listeners before Finnish and international telecommunications regulatory authorities.  SRAL is the national member society representing Finland in both Nordic Radio Amateur Union and International Amateur Radio Union.

References

See also 
International Amateur Radio Union
Nordic Radio Amateur Union

International Amateur Radio Union member societies
Non-profit organisations based in Finland
Organizations established in 1921
1921 establishments in Finland
Organisations based in Helsinki
Radio in Finland